Ger Cushe (born 3 March 1967 in Gorey, County Wexford) is a retired Irish sportsperson.  He played hurling with his local club Naomh Éanna and was a member of the Wexford senior inter-county team from 1991 until 1999.

Playing career

Club

Cushe played his club hurling with his local Naomh Éanna club in Gorey.  He had some success with the club at underage level and in 1990 he captained the side to a Wexford intermediate hurling championship title.

Inter-county

In the mid 1980s Cushe joined the Wexford minor hurling team.  He won a Leinster title with his native-county in 1985, however, Wexford later lost the All-Ireland final to Cork.  Cushe later graduated onto Wexford's under-21 team where he won back-to-back Leinster titles in 1986 and 1987.  Once again he was denied an All-Ireland medal, this time by Galway.  Cushe made his senior debut in the first round of the National Hurling League in 1990.  Six years later in 1996 Cushe was the Wexford full-back when he won his first senior Leinster title.  He subsequently claimed his first, and only, All-Ireland medal following a win over Limerick in an unexciting final.  Cushe captured a second Leinster title in 1997, however, Wexford were later defeated by Tipperary in the All-Ireland semi-final.  The following years proved difficult as Wexford and Cushe faced a resurgent Offaly in the Leinster championship.  He retired from inter-county hurling in 1999.

Post-playing career

In retirement from playing Cushe maintained a keen interest in the game.  Shortly after his retirement in 1999 he became a selector with the Wexford team.  During his tenure on the management team Wexford had little success and he stepped down in 2002.

References

Teams

1967 births
Living people
Naomh Éanna hurlers
Wexford inter-county hurlers
All-Ireland Senior Hurling Championship winners